WKCY is a news/talk formatted broadcast radio station licensed to Harrisonburg, Virginia, serving Harrisonburg and Rockingham County, Virginia.  WKCY is owned and operated by iHeartMedia, Inc.

History
WKCY signed on the air on May 11, 1967.  WKCY-AM-FM were acquired by the Mid-Atlantic Network in 1989.  Clear Channel Communications, based in San Antonio, Texas, acquired WKCY-AM-FM in 2001.

Translator
In addition to the main station, WKCY is relayed by an FM translator to widen its broadcast area.

References

External links
 NewsRadio WKCY Online

1967 establishments in Virginia
News and talk radio stations in the United States
Radio stations established in 1967
KCY
IHeartMedia radio stations